Alexander Koch may refer to:

Alexander Koch (actor) (born 1988), American actor
Alexander Koch (fencer) (born 1969), German fencer
Alexander Koch (rower) (born 1967), Swiss Olympic rower